Kara Wai Ying-hung BBS (born 3 February 1960) is a Hong Kong actress best known internationally for her roles in wuxia films produced by the Shaw Brothers Studio in the 1970s and 1980s.

Wai has since portrayed a wide range of roles on screen and on television with much success. She is the inaugural and a three-time recipient of Hong Kong Film Award for Best Actress. Her portrayal of a mother in the 2009 film At the End of Daybreak won her acting awards at the Hong Kong Film Awards, Hong Kong Film Critics Society Awards, Changchun Film Festival, Pacific Meridian, Asian Film Awards, and Golden Horse Awards. In following years, she went on to win multiple acting trophies throughout Asia Pacific from film roles, making her as one of the most celebrated Hong Kong actresses.

On 1 July 2018, she was awarded Bronze Bauhinia Star (BBS) by the Chief Executive of Hong Kong Special Administration Region, in recognition of her contribution to Hong Kong film industry and acting performances.

Personal life
Born in Hong Kong, she is the fourth oldest out of six children. She is of Manchu descent. Her elder brother was Austin Wai. In her early years, Wai's family resided in the poor shanty town of Rennie's Mill. She didn't keep studying since she finish primary school. In her interview on Be My Guest, Wai revealed her family lost their savings due to her father's business acquaintances. Left penniless, Wai's mother, herself, and her siblings were forced to peddle goods on the streets of Hong Kong. As a teen, she often sold gum and souvenirs in Wan Chai to sailors.

At the age of 14, she began taking dance lessons at the defunct Miramar nightclub and Northern style weaponry lessons from Donnie Yen's mother, Bow-sim Mark. Wai did Chinese dance for three years.

Director Chang Cheh is her godfather.

In 1999, she suffered from depression, and her career was in low ebb. She attempted suicide at the age of 40. In 2003, with the help of friends and relatives, Wai began to recover.

In March 2021, Wai expressed her support for cotton produced in Xinjiang after several companies announced they will stop purchasing cotton from the region due to concerns over forced labour from Uyghurs; a move echoed by most Chinese celebrities.

Career

1977–1987: Shaw Brothers Studio
During the film shoot for Dirty Ho (1979), the lead actress quit due to the strain of the martial arts stunts. Wai was then an extra in the film. Director Liu Chia-Liang had seen Wai's audition tape for The Brave Archer (1977) and decided to substitute her in as the lead actress. This was their first time working together. Impressed by her performance, Liu would go on to cast Wai in his other projects.

Wai reached her career apex with My Young Auntie (1982), for which she was earned the Award for Best Actress at the 1st Hong Kong Film Awards.

Wai's last film with Shaw Brothers was The Eight Diagram Pole Fighter (1984).

1988–2002 
In 1987, Wai traveled to Paris, France, to conduct a nude photoshoot for Playboy. The photos were taken by Byron Newman. The photo book was published in 1989.

2003–2010: Return and TVB 
In 2005, she quietly returned to the Hong Kong entertainment industry. In addition to film, she joined television network TVB and was nominated for a TVB Anniversary Award for Best Supporting Actress in 2009 for Rosy Business and in 2010 for A Fistful of Stances.

In 2009, Wai won the 46th Golden Horse Awards for Best Supporting Actress for her role as a possessive mother in At the End of Daybreak. The film has also won the 16th the Hong Kong Institute of Film Critics award for Best Actress, the 4th Asian Film Awards for Best Supporting Actress, the 29th Hong Kong film awards Best Actress, the 10th Chinese movie media awards "best actress", the 10th China changchun film festival Best Actress in Vladivostok, Russia international film festival has won seven awards Best Actress.

2011–present 
Wai made her first mainland TV appearance in the series The Glamorous Imperial Concubine. She took a pay cut to play Wu Zetian in her next mainland drama, Women of the Tang Dynasty. The role garnered her a Best Supporting Actress nomination at the 13th Huading Awards.

In 2012, Wai officially transferred to the king of the arts and is now a contract actress. In 2013, Wai signed a one-year drama contract with HKTV. Her first role with them was as the Black Rose on Incredible Mama. She won Best Supporting Actress for the Malaysian film The Wedding Diary (2011) at the 2013 Golden Wau Awards, a ceremony celebrating Chinese language films in Malaysia.

In 2014, Wai won the Best Supporting Actress award at the 33rd Hong Kong Film Awards for her film Rigor Mortis.

In 2017, she won the Best Actress Award at the 36th Hong Kong film awards for Happiness.

In March 2018, Wai won the Excellence In Asian Cinema Award at the 12th Asian Film Awards.

In October 2018, she was awarded the Bronze Bauhinia Star for her outstanding achievements in the performing arts industry by the Chief Executive Carrie Lam.

In 2018, Wai starred as the conservative wife of a closeted transgender woman in Tracey. The film earned Wai the Award for Best Supporting Actress at the 38th Hong Kong Film Awards and the Award for Best Supporting Actress at the 13th Asian Film Awards.

In 2019, Wai earned critical acclaim with her role as Chief Superintendent Man Hei-wah (Madam Man) in the TVB crime drama The Defected, for which she won the Best Actress award at the 2019 TVB Anniversary Awards.

In 2021, Wai and Hugo Ng Doi-Yung starred in the movie "Sunshine of my life" as a blind parent of a normal child, played by Karena Ng. In the same year, she starred in the TVB crime thriller Murder Diary, in which she portrayed Yeung Bik-sum, a mental hospital assistant with schizophrenia, and was once again highly praised for her acting skills.

Filmography

Film

1970s

1980s

1990s

2000s

2010s

Television dramas

Awards and nominations

References

External links

 

1960 births
Living people
20th-century Hong Kong actresses
21st-century Hong Kong actresses
Actresses from Shandong
Best Supporting Actress Asian Film Award winners
Hong Kong film actresses
Hong Kong people of Manchu descent
Hong Kong television actresses
Manchu actresses
Recipients of the Bronze Bauhinia Star
Shaw Brothers Studio
TVB veteran actors